Milen Bonev (born 1 July 1986 in Tryavna) is a Bulgarian football player, currently playing for Kaliakra Kavarna as a defender.

References

Living people
1986 births
Bulgarian footballers
Association football defenders
PFC Kaliakra Kavarna players
First Professional Football League (Bulgaria) players
People from Tryavna